The 2013 Nantou earthquake struck central Taiwan with a moment magnitude of 6.2 on 2 June at  local time. The epicenter was located in mountainous terrain in Ren'ai Township, Nantou County, Taiwan, not far from Sun Moon Lake, close to the epicentre of another large earthquake a little over two months earlier. News reports indicate that five people were killed; three in Nantou County and two in neighbouring Chiayi County. The earthquake could be felt in Hong Kong, Zhejiang, Fujian, and Guangdong, China.

See also
List of earthquakes in 2013
List of earthquakes in Taiwan

References

Further reading

2013 06 Nantou
2013 earthquakes
2013 in Taiwan